Sons of Rico are an Australian four-piece indie pop rock band, originally from Perth, Western Australia.

History
Sons of Rico started out as a duo between Alex MacRae and Adam Weston in early 2004, under the name, Bus#56. The band subsequently expanded to a four-piece band with the addition of Glenn Sarangapany and then James Trewenack, with MacRae the main songwriter.

The band's first release was an EP, Orange Skies, in November 2007.  The EP was recorded by MacRae and Weston and then mixed and mastered by Shaun O' Callaghan at Studio Couch. Initially the EP was only available at live performances of the band.

In 2010, the band and expanding to a five-piece with the addition of keyboardist, Brett Murray.

IN August 2010, the band released "This Madness", the lead single from their forthcoming debut studio album. The song, according to MacRae, draws inspiration from a true story out of England where a boy posed as a spy on the internet and convinced an older boy to murder him. "A relatively long and twisted story, but the idea I'm playing on is how we can all go a bit crazy when we let our heart and brain get their wires crossed. It's a little bit dark and the upbeat music makes it a pretty funny contrast."

In October 2010 they released their debut album, Reactions. The album was recorded and engineered by Dave Parkin and mastered in New York by Steve Fallone. 

In 2012 MacRae relocated to Brisbane, Queensland to write and work on pre-production for Sons of Rico's sophomore album In Rico Glaciers. On 2 July MacRae and Weston teamed up with ARIA award winning Australian music producer Magoo at Applewood Studio in Fernvale, Queensland to record and engineer the album. The album was released on 29 March 2013 through Firestarter and Inertia.

Discography

Studio albums

Extended plays

Awards

WAM Song of the Year
The WAM Song of the Year was formed by the  Western Australian Rock Music Industry Association Inc. (WARMIA) in 1985, with its main aim to develop and run annual awards recognising achievements within the music industry in Western Australia.

 (wins only)
|-
| 2010
| "Mis Adventure"
| Rock Song of the Year
| 
|-

References

External links 

 Sons of Rico on Facebook
 Twitter

Australian indie pop groups
Musical groups from Perth, Western Australia
Western Australian musical groups
Musical groups established in 2007